The episodes of Transformers: Animated are split into a set of 3 seasons, 13 episodes in each with the first season bearing a special movie-length (later divided into a 3-episode showing) beginning. An episode list for the first two seasons (a combined total of 26 episodes) has been released through Cartoon Network's website. Both the series' first season and the entire series itself began with "Transform and Roll Out", a 90-minute movie special starting point later broken up into three episodes for re-runs. Following the debut of the movie on December 26, 2007, the series properly began on January 5 next year. The series returned with the third season on March 14 1 year after 2008 in the US and Canada.

Series overview

Episodes

Season 1 (2007–08) 
The first season (consisting of sixteen episodes - a movie-length beginning later divided into a 3-part story and 13 ordinary episodes afterward) began on December 26, 2007, with its movie-length/later three-part premiere "Transform and Roll Out", and ended on April 5, 2008, with part 2 of "Megatron Rising". The season's main theme following "Transform and Roll Out" centered primarily around Megatron's return after his defeat during his first battle with Optimus Prime. Meanwhile, the Autobots (Optimus, Bumblebee, Ratchet, Prowl, and Bulkhead) learn more about 22nd-century Earth from eight-year-old human Sari Sumdac, who has an encounter with the AllSpark that transforms her security key into a mystical Cybertronian artifact with vast powers. At the same time, the Autobots battle members of Megatron's old crew, including Starscream, Blackarachnia, Lugnut, and Blitzwing, while befriending some of the local humans, including Sari, her father, Professor Isaac Sumdac (who is tricked into helping Megatron) and machine-hating police officer Captain Fanzone.

Season 2 (2008) 
This season (having thirteen episodes) began merely two whole weeks after the first season had ended, on April 19, 2008, with the airing of "The Elite Guard", and ended on July 5, 2008, with the two-parter, "A Bridge Too Close". The season revolved mainly around the Autobots in the aftermath of Megatron's return, trying to restore the city and their image. Meanwhile, Megatron, Lugnut, and Blitzwing have captured Prof. Sumdac in order to build a Space Bridge, hoping to use it to conquer a weakened Cybertron from within, while Starscream tries to get his revenge against Megatron. A sub-plot also focuses on Sari as she searches for her father, while learning that there is no record of her existence of any means. Also, Blackarachnia (originally Elita One) has been reduced to a minor recurring character, only appearing in one episode of the entire season ("Black Friday").

Season 3 (2009) 
The third season began on March 14, 2009 with the three-part premiere, "Transwarped", and ended on May 23, 2009 with two-part "Endgame". This season following the events of "Transwarped" focused on the Autobots' attempt to reach Cybertron in order to warn the Autobot High Council of Shockwave, who has been masquerading as Autobot Intelligence Officer Longarm Prime. Meanwhile, Megatron, Starscream, Shockwave (who replaces Blitzwing as a main character), and Lugnut plan to use the colossal Autobot Omega Supreme for constructing clones of him (dubbed as Lugnut Supremes, as they appear similar to Lugnut).

Despite no longer being a main character, Blitzwing returns in three episodes ("Five Servos of Doom", "Human Error, Part 1" and "Decepticon Air"), and Blackarachnia returned for one episode ("Predacons Rising").
The show so-called "concluded" with "Endgame, Part 2" but left many things unresolved and unexplained; mainly Sari's unique origins and ever developing and increasingly powerful Cybertonian abilities as a techno-organic Autobot, and most characters' fates left a mystery.

Season 4 
Episodes 43-58
The unmade yet long-awaited fourth season would be centered on pure energon, since the partial reassembled AllSpark had left Energon deposits all over Detroit and the surrounding area following the events of "Endgame". On August 17, 2019, the United Kingdom-based Transformers event TFNation 2019 an outline of the season's movie-length premiere "Trial of Megatron" was presented by Marty Isenberg, with most of the show's original cast reprising their original roles in that fashion.

The voice cast for the outline reading consisted of David Kaye as Optimus Prime, Lugnut, and Cliffjumper; Bumper Robinson as Bumblebee and Blitzwing; Corey Burton as Megatron, Ratchet, Ironhide (who joins Optimus' team, replacing Bulkhead as a main character) and Shockwave; Phil LaMarr as Jazz (replacing the deceased Prowl as a main character), Omega Supreme, Jetstorm, and Alpha Trion; Aimee "Ladywreck" Morgan (substituting Tara Strong) as Sari; Bill Fagerbakke as Bulkhead; Jeff Bennet as Prowl (who appears as an AllSpark spirit) and  Ultra Magnus (who goes offline after being attacked by Shockwave in "Where Is Thy Sting?", unable to revived even by Sari's mysterious and mighty power); Townsend Coleman as Sentinel Prime; Chris Finney as Uplink (an Autobot reporter created for the outline) and Rodimus Prime (substituting Judd Nelson); Susan Blu as Arcee; Tom Kenny as Jetfire, Rattletrap, Professor Sumdac, Sunstorm, Ramjet, Scrapper, and Beachcomber; Peter Spellos as Trac-Tor (an Autobot farmer also created for the outline); David Wallace (substituting Robinson) as Blackout; and Leanne Gilks as a Trypticon Prison guard. Other characters featured in the outline included Perceptor, Wheeljack, Red Alert, Dai Altas, Strika, Oil Slick, Cyclonus, Spittor, and Obsidian (a new incarnation of the Beast Machines Vehicon of the same name).

Various other details would have included Sari uncovering her origin and continuing her education on Cybertron while helping Bulkhead protect the Energon farms from Decepticons, Ironhide receiving an Earth vehicle mode, and Bludgeon appearing as a pirate.

References 

Lists of Cartoon Network television series episodes
Lists of American children's animated television series episodes
Animated